The 2003–04 Japan Figure Skating Championships were the 72nd edition of the event. They were held between December 25 and 26, 2003 at the Big Hat arena in Nagano. Skaters competed on the senior level in the disciplines of men's singles, ladies' singles, and ice dancing. No pairs competition was held due to a lack of entrants. The competition was used to decide Japan's entries to the 2004 World Championships and the 2004 Four Continents Championships. The entries to the 2004 World Junior Championships were decided at the Japanese Junior Championships.

Results

Men

Ladies

Ice dancing

Japan Junior Figure Skating Championships
The 2003–04 Japan Junior Figure Skating Championships were used to pick the Japanese team to the 2004 World Junior Championships. They took place between November 21 and 23, 2003 in Kyoto.

Men

Ladies

Ice dancing

External links
 2003–04 Japan Figure Skating Championships results 
 2003–04 Japan Junior Figure Skating Championships results 
 ビッグハット

Japan Figure Skating Championships
2003 in figure skating
2004 in figure skating
2003 in Japanese sport